NRDS Dhamdhama is a private computer institute in Dhamdhama, Nalbari, India. Established in 2010, it offers degrees such as a Diploma in Computer Application and Maintenance (DCAM), Diploma in Computer Software Engineering (DCSE), Post Graduate Diploma in Computer Education (PGDCA), and Diploma in Desktop Publishing (DTP).

NRDS is an educational Institute of India for the development of rural areas. The goal of NRDS is to make every person technically proficient. The aim and object of NRDS Tech Section is to provide technical education in rural areas of India through the NRDS Rural Project and make every Indian independent. RDS is an ISO 9001:2008 Certified Institute.

References

External links
 NRDS

Engineering colleges in Assam
Educational institutions established in 2010
2010 establishments in Assam